Men in Love may refer to:
 Men in Love (song)
 Men in Love (film)

See also
 Man in Love (disambiguation)